Who I AM is the third studio album by Spanish pop music artist Abraham Mateo. The album was released on November 3, 2014, through Sony Music Spain. Who I Am peaked at number one in Mexico and Spain and was certified Platinum by Promusicae.

In May 2014, Mateo traveled to Los Angeles, California with his producer Jacobo Calderón to work on his third studio album. In L.A. he had writing sessions with Damon Sharpe, Lauren Christy, Andre Merritt and other songwriters. In July 2014, Mateo announced the name of his new album, Who I AM, and the release date (Autumn 2014). The album was produced in Madrid and mixed in Los Angeles. It contains broken beats, a funk vibe futuristic beats and organic arrangements.

The first single and album's opening track "All The Girls", written by Lauren Christy, Jacobo Calderón and Mateo himself, was released alongside the pre-order of the album on iTunes on September 23, 2014. "All The Girls" peaked at number 9 on the Spain's Top 50 singles chart.

Who I AM Hardback Book Edition includes three Bonus Tracks (#13, #14, #15) and a DVD with a documentary, featuring unreleased footage from his tour around Latin America and Spain in 2014 and from the studio in Los Angeles while he recorded the album. Who I AM was sold on iTunes including also the bonus track "Zero fahrenheit".

A Special Edition of Who I AM was released on June 22, 2015. It includes a CD with six Bonus Tracks and a DVD with live performances featuring Spanish groups Dvicio, Critika & Saik and Lerica.

Track listing

Charts

Weekly Charts

Year-end charts

Singles

Certifications

References

2014 albums
Abraham Mateo albums
Sony Music albums